In Danish folklore, a valravn (Danish "raven of the slain") is a supernatural raven. Those ravens appear in traditional Danish folksongs, where they are described as originating from ravens who consume the bodies of the dead on the battlefield, as capable of turning into the form of a knight after consuming the heart of a child, and, alternately, as half-wolf and half-raven creatures.

Folklore
According to Danish folklore recorded in the late 1800s, when a king or chieftain was killed in battle and not found and buried, ravens came and ate him. The ravens became valravne. The valravne that ate the king's heart gained human knowledge and could perform great malicious acts, could lead people astray, had superhuman powers, and were "terrible animals".

In another account, a valravn is described as a peaceless soul in search of redemption that flies by night (but never day) and can only free itself from its animal countenance by consuming the blood of a child. This is reflected in a Danish traditional song that describes how, after refusing offers of riches, the Valravn makes an agreement with a maiden to take her to her betrothed after she promises the valravn her first born son. After the agreement, the valravn flies away. In time, the couple have a child and the Valravn returns, and asks the maiden if she has forgotten her promise. The valravn takes the child away, and tears into the chest of his won wager and consumes the blood contained within the child's heart. As a result, the valravn transforms into a knight. This traditional song was reinterpreted by the electro-folk band Sorten Muld and became a hit for them in 1997, under the title Ravnen.

Other accounts describe valravns as monsters that are half-wolf and half-raven.

Interpretations and theories
According to 19th century scholar Jacob Grimm, the "vilde ravn or vilde valravn" ("wild raven or wild Valravn") take "exactly the place of the diabolical trold" in Danish folk songs. Grimm proposes an Old High German equivalent to the Danish valravn; *walahraban.

Modern influence
The Valravn has inspired occasional pop culture references, including an early 20th century book of short stories as well as the Faroese musical group bearing the name, who play a form of traditional music.

Valravn was the title of a Danish Germanic Neopagan magazine published from 2002 to 2007. The name is also mentioned in Danish children's books.

The titular mecha and namesake of the 2013 Sci-Fi anime Valvrave the Liberator is based on the Valvravn and draws heavy influence from various aspects of their folklore.

The 2017 video game Hellblade: Senua's Sacrifice features Valravn as "god of illusion", a stage boss the player must defeat to proceed in the game.

Valravn appear as an enemy in the 5th bestiary of the Pathfinder Roleplaying Game, using Grimm's Vilderavn moniker for the creature.

Valravn is the name of Cedar Point's 2016 dive roller coaster.

Valravns feature in the fantasy novel The Absolute Book (2019) by Elizabeth Knox.

A valravn named Val is featured as a companion to a reaper in the supernatural thriller novel Bleed More, Bodymore (2021) by Ian Kirkpatrick.

Valravn's Claw is a short sword available in the Ubisoft title Assassin's Creed Valhalla as a redeemable reward on Ubisoft Connect.

The 2020 album and song by Gealdýr is called "Valravn".

See also
Helhest, a three-legged horse that appears in graveyards in Danish folklore
Huginn and Muninn, the ravens of the god Odin in Norse mythology
Raven banner, a Viking Age banner bearing the standard of the raven
Valkyrie, female "choosers of the slain" of Norse mythology, associated with ravens

Notes

References

 Bjerre, Birgit (1991). Skovtrolden i Lerbjergskoven. Høst & Søn. 
 Grimm, Jacob (James Steven Stallybrass Trans.) (2004). Teutonic Mythology: Translated from the Fourth Edition with Notes and Appendix by James Stallybrass. Volume III. Dover Publications. 
 Kristensen, Evald Tang (1980). Danske Sagn: Som De Har Lyd I Folkemunde. Nyt Nordisk Forlag Arnold Busck, Copenhagen. 
 Olrik, Axel. Falbe, Ida Hansen. (1909) Danske Folkeviser. Gyldendal.
 Stuckenberg, Viggo Henrik Fog (1908). Valravn og Sol: smaa romaner. Gyldendal.
 Senua

Legendary birds
Scandinavian folklore
Scandinavian legendary creatures